Michael, Brother of Jerry is a novel by Jack London released in 1917. This novel is loosely connected to his previous novel Jerry of the Islands, also released in 1917. Each book tells the story of one of two dog  siblings, Jerry and Michael, born in the Solomon Islands.

Plot
Michael, an Irish terrier, was born and raised in the Solomon Islands. The dog now works as a slave hunter aboard a schooner on a mission to recruit native islanders for work. One day the captain accidentally leaves Michael  on a beach and sails away. Michael was then abducted by Dag Daughtry, a steward on another ship, who initially planned to sell the dog for money. However, later he got attached to Michael and takes the dog to a trip around the world.

A major theme in the book is how various animals are taught to perform for the public.  In his Forward, Jack London says that this was a major reason for writing the book.

References

External links
Profile on Google Books

1917 American novels
Novels published posthumously
Novels by Jack London
Cruelty to animals